We Need Each Other (Swedish: Vi behöver varann) is a 1944 Swedish drama film directed by Hampe Faustman and starring Ludde Gentzel, Ingrid Borthen and Carl Ström with location shooting in Stadshagen, Djurgården and the city's Old Town. It was shot at the Centrumateljéerna Studios in Stockholm. The film's sets were designed by the art director P.A. Lundgren. It was produced to celebrate the hundredth year of the foundation of the Cooperative movement by the Rochdale Society of Equitable Pioneers in 1844.

Cast
 Ludde Gentzel as 	Malm
 Hampe Faustman as 	Malm's Father
 Ingrid Borthen as 	Elsa Trotsig
 Carl Ström as 	Trotsig
 Sture Baude as 	Squire
 Sven Lindberg as 	Young Squire
 Harry Ahlin as Handske
 Arne Nyberg as 	Martin Sundell
 Anders Ek as Svensk Kooperatör hos Phoebus
 Georg Funkquist as 	Phoebus
 Ingrid Östergren as 	Secretary
 Siv Thulin as 	Mary
 Julia Cæsar as Old lady
 Sture Ericson as 	Blacksmith
 Åke Fridell as Secretary
 Erik Strandmark as Guest at Café
 Gunnel Wadner as Abused Girl
 Birger Malmsten as 	Guest at Café
 Nils Hallberg as 	Guest at the Café

References

Bibliography 
 Qvist, Per Olov & von Bagh, Peter. Guide to the Cinema of Sweden and Finland. Greenwood Publishing Group, 2000.

External links 
 

1944 films
1944 drama films
1940s Swedish-language films
Films directed by Hampe Faustman
Films set in Lancashire
Films set in the 1840s
Swedish historical drama films
1940s historical drama films
1940s Swedish films